The 1980 Baltimore International, also known by its sponsored name First National Classic, was a men's tennis tournament played on indoor carpet courts at the Towson State College in Baltimore, Maryland in the United States that was part of the 1980 Grand Prix circuit. It was the ninth edition of the event and was held from January 14 through January 20, 1980. First-seeded Harold Solomon won his second consecutive singles title at the event.

Finals

Singles
 Harold Solomon defeated  Tim Gullikson  6–4, 7–5  
 It was Solomon's 1st singles title of the year and the 19th of his career.

Doubles
 Marty Riessen /  Tim Gullikson defeated  Brian Gottfried /  Frew McMillan 2–6, 6–3, 6–4

References

External links
 ITF tournament edition details

Baltimore International
Baltimore International
Baltimore International
Baltimore International